Dragičević is a South Slavic surname. Notable people with the surname include:

Boris Dragičević (born 1958), Croatian handball player and coach
David Dragičević (1997–2018), Bosnian man who died under suspicious circumstances
Georg Dragičević (1890–1980), Croatian soldier
Ivan Dragičević (born 1981), Serbian football defender
Marc Dragicevic (born 1981), Australian rules footballer
Marko Dragičević (born 1976), Croatian rower
Mate Dragičević (born 1979), Croatian football striker
Milorad Dragićević (1904–1975), Serbian football player
Milutin Dragićević (born 1983), Serbian handball player
Pavao Dragičević (1694–1773), Bosnian Franciscan friar and bishop
Prvoslav Dragićević (1914–1974), Serbian football manager and player
Radislav Dragićević (born 1971), Montenegrin football midfielder
Rajna Dragićević, Serbian linguist, lexicologist and lexicographer
Nikola Dragičević (born 1988), Serbian football player
Strahinja Dragićević (born 1986), Serbian basketball player
Tadija Dragićević (born 1986), Serbian basketball player, twin brother of Strahinja
Tamara Dragičević (born 1989), Serbian actress and model
Vladimir Dragičević (born 1986), Montenegrin basketball player
Zdravko Dragićević (born 1986), Montenegrin football player

See also
Dragić
Dragović
Dragojević

Croatian surnames
Serbian surnames